Cardón can refer to:

Cardón, Venezuela, a town in Venezuela
Echinopsis atacamensis, a species of cactus
Euphorbia canariensis, a cactus-like species of Euphorbia
Pachycereus pringlei, a species of cactus